The 2017 V.League 2 (referred to as  Sứ Thiên Thanh V.League 2 for sponsorship reasons) is the 23rd season of V.League 2, Vietnam's second tier professional football league. The season began on 11 February 2017 and finished on 26 July 2017. The season started with 7 clubs after the withdrawals of 3 clubs without any replaces.

Changes from last season

Team changes
The following teams had changed division since the 2016 season.

To V.League 2
Promoted from Vietnamese Second League
 PVF
Relegated from V.League 1
 Đồng Tháp

From V.League 2
Relegated to Vietnamese Second League
 Cà MauRelegated to Vietnamese Third League
 Đồng Nai (due to financial problems)
Promoted to V.League 1
 TP Hồ Chí MinhFolded
 Phú Yên
 PVF

Rule changes
There is only one promotion spot for the champion. Club finishing last will play a play-off match against the 4th-placed club of 2017 Second League.

Teams

Stadiums and locations

Personnel and kits

League table

Results

Play-off match 

Đồng Tháp won the match and remained in 2018 V.League 2.

Positions by round

Season progress

Season statistics

Top scorers
{| class="wikitable" 
|-
!Rank
!Player
!Club
!Goals
|-
|rowspan=4|1
| Võ Văn Minh
|Huế
|rowspan=4|5
|-
| Phạm Văn Thuận
|Nam Định
|-
| Nguyễn Hồng Quân
|Đắk Lắk
|-
| Bùi Duy Thường
|Viettel
|-
|rowspan=2|5
| Nguyễn Thiện Chí
|Đồng Tháp
|rowspan=2|4
|-
| Lê Đức Tài
|Fico Tây Ninh

Own goals

Hattrick

Speaking numbers
 Victory at home with the biggest score: Viettel won 4-0 against Fico Tay Ninh on Thien Truong Stadium in round 14 on July 26, 2017.
 The biggest away win: Nam Dinh lost 0-4 against Dong Thap on Thien Truong Stadium in the second round on 18 February 2017.
 Most goals scored: 6 goals in XM Fico Tay Ninh's 4-2 win over Nam Dinh on Tay Ninh in round 10 on July 1, 2017.
 The team has the longest winning sequence of three matches that is: Viettel from February 11 (round 1) to February 25, 2017 (round 3); Nam Dinh from July 5 (round 11) to July 15, 2017 (round 13). 
 The team has the longest unbeaten 7 games, which is Hue from February 11 (round 1) to April 1, 2017 (round 8).
 The team has the longest winning streak of 10 games, which is Dong Thap from February 25 (Round 3) to July 26, 2017 (Round 14).
 The team has the longest losing streak of four matches, which is Dong Thap from March 4 (Round 4) to April 1, 2017 (Round 8).
 Audience attended the most 20,000 spectators in the match between Nam Dinh beat Viettel 1-0 at Thien Truong Stadium in round 13 on July 26, 2017.
 The audience attended at least 200 spectators in the match between Viettel 1-1 draw against Dak Lak on My Dinh National Stadium in round 11 on July 5, 2017.

Attendances

By round

By club

References

External links
Official Page

V.League 2